KHNU (620 AM) (branded as Honu 62) was a radio station broadcasting a News/Talk format. Licensed to Hilo, Hawaii, United States, the station served the Hilo area. The station was owned by Matthew Clapp, Jr., through licensee Mahalo Multimedia, LLC. It was licensed to operate experimental synchronous operations at Kalaoa and Naalehu.

History
This station began their broadcasts as KIPA in 1947 through various formats. It moved from 1110 AM to 620 AM in 1973. The most recent format was oldies/adult standards music that has featured programming from ABC Radio's "Timeless Favorites" satellite feed. In 2007, its previous owner Skynet had to sign KIPA off the air after the station lost its transmitter lease. New owners brought the station back on the air with a new callsign and new format that featured programming from Sean Hannity, Dr. Laura Schlessinger, Michael Savage, and Handel on the Law, among other hosts.

On December 4, 2015, the Federal Communications Commission notified KHNU's licensee that the station's license had expired effective November 22, 2015, due to the station having been silent for the previous year.

References

External links

HNU
News and talk radio stations in the United States
Radio stations established in 1947
1947 establishments in Hawaii
Radio stations disestablished in 2015
2015 disestablishments in Hawaii
Defunct radio stations in the United States
NHU